is a Japanese singer-songwriter and musician, coming to prominence in the late 1970s as the lead vocalist and guitarist in the group Ippu-Do. His subsequent output includes solo work and collaborations. 

Tsuchiya's career in music started with a brief stint aged 17 in 1969 as a roadie and stand-in guitarist with The Golden Cups. However, it was discovered that he had lied about his age when his family tracked him down so he was forced to leave the band.

In 1972 Tsuchiya was recruited by Nobu Saito to work as a session guitarist, going on to record and tour with Lily and the Bye Bye Session band (one of the other members was Ryuichi Sakamoto) and became a regular member of Junko Ohashi and Minoya Central Station, leaving in 1978 with the formation of Ippu-Do. Since 1982 Tsuchiya has worked with artists as diverse as English new wave rockers Japan and Bill Nelson, Japanese electronica composer Ryuichi Sakamoto, Duran Duran side-project Arcadia, and Japanese rock band Buck-Tick.

In March 2008, Tsuchiya formed the rock band Vitamin-Q along with Kazuhiko Katō, Gota Yashiki, Rei Ohara and Anza. However, after Kato's suicide on October 17, 2009, the fate of the group is uncertain.

In June 2010, following news of former collaborator Mick Karn's (former Japan bassist) cancer diagnosis, Tsuchiya reunited with former bandmates Gota Yashiki, Vivian Hsu, and Masahide Sakuma (of Japanese new wave group Plastics) and recorded two songs for a proposed September 2010 release to raise funds for Karn and his family. The musicians had recorded together as The d.e.p. in the early 2000s, releasing the album Shinkei Stop in 2001.

Discography

Solo and collaborations
 (1982) Rice Music - album
 (1983) Alone - book with flex disc records
 (1985) Tokyo Ballet - album
 (1986) Life In Mirrors - album
 (1988) Horizon - album
 (1989) Time Passenger - album
 (1998) Forest People - album
 (2013) Swan Dive - EP

Contributions
 (1982) Kim Wilde, "Select" - composer of the song "Bitter is Better"
 (1983) Japan, "Oil on Canvas" - guitar and keyboards
 (1985) Arcadia, "So Red the Rose" - guitars, violin
 (2004) dr jan guru (Jan Linton), "Planet Japan" - guitar
 (2004) Sakurai Atsushi, Ai no Wakusei - composer of the song "Shingetsu"
 (2019) The Yellow Monkey, 9999 - co-arranged "Kono Koi no Kakera" and "Kegawa no Kōto no Blues"

Other work
 Parade -Respective Tracks of Buck-Tick- (December 21, 2005, "Mienai Mono o Miyo to Suru Gokai Subete Gokai da")
 Luna Sea Memorial Cover Album -Re:birth- (December 19, 2007, "Moon")

References

Living people
Japanese rock guitarists
Musicians from Shizuoka Prefecture
Year of birth missing (living people)